Đinh Diễm Liên (born 17 December 1971) is a Vietnamese American singer and actress.

Biography

Childhood
Diễm Liên was born in Việt Nam into a family of five sisters where all the girls, including her mother, are named Liên. The only difference is their middle name. Their family traveled to the United States when she was still young. They resides in Arizona for a short time, when she came of age, moved to California along with her family to pursue her career in music and acting.

As a child, Diễm Liên was dedicated to performing and singing. She would often sing at school gatherings and at local nightclubs. Her father is a South Vietnamese Army soldier who tried to hold off North Vietnamese infantry to prevent South Vietnam from falling. Her family left South Vietnam during Fall of Saigon.

Tour
Diễm Liên often goes on tour and performs. Her shows mostly consist of stops around California, especially the Bay Area. San Jose being one of her favorite places to perform, she often sings once a month there at the local clubs and stays with one of her best friends Kimberly Nguyễn.

Filmography

References

External links
 

1971 births
Living people
People from Da Lat
Vietnamese emigrants to the United States
21st-century Vietnamese women singers
Vietnamese film actresses
20th-century Vietnamese actresses
21st-century Vietnamese actresses